Frank Liddell (born November 13, 1963) is an American record producer. A former artists and repertoire director at Decca Records, he founded Carnival Music in 1999. Liddell is also married to singer Lee Ann Womack, for whom he has produced. Other acts that Liddell produces include Miranda Lambert and the Eli Young Band.

Liddell has won the Academy of Country Music's Album of the Year award three times: for Crazy Ex-Girlfriend in 2008, Revolution in 2010, and for Four the Record in 2012.

References

American country record producers
Living people
People from Houston
1963 births
Record producers from Texas